Malti is an Indian feminine given name. Notable people with the name include:

Malti Devi (1968–1999), Indian politician
Malti Joshi (born 1934), Indian novelist, essayist, and writer
Malti Sharma (1930–2018), Indian politician

Indian feminine given names